3AC may refer to:
 Toyota A engine
 Three-address code
 Three-phase electric power
 Three Arrows Capital, a cryptocurrency hedge fund